We Are Seven is a television drama series set in Wales and based on the 1955 book of the same name by Una Troy. It was produced by HTV Wales and shown on ITV. It ran for 2 seasons between 11 June 1989 and 17 July 1991.

Cast and characters

Episodes

Series 1 (1989)

"Episode 1" (11 June 1989); director: Alan Clayton
"Episode 2" (18 June 1989); director: Alan Clayton
"Episode 3" (25 June 1989); director: Alan Clayton
"Episode 4" (2 July 1989); director: Alan Clayton
"Episode 5" (9 July 1989); director: Alan Clayton
"Episode 6" (16 July 1989); director: Alan Clayton

Series 2 (1991)

"Episode 1" (29 May 1991); director: Ken Horn
"Episode 2" (5 June 1991); director: Ken Horn
"Episode 3" (12 June 1991); director: Ken Horn
"Episode 4" (26 June 1991); director: Ken Horn
"Episode 5" (3 July 1991); director: Ken Horn
"Episode 6" (10 July 1991); director: Ken Horn
"Episode 7" (17 July 1991); director: Ken Horn

Home media
Both series were released individually on VHS in the UK by Video Gems in 1991.

References

External links

1989 British television series debuts
1991 British television series endings
1980s British drama television series
1990s British drama television series
ITV television dramas
Welsh television shows
Television shows based on British novels
Television series by ITV Studios
Television shows produced by Harlech Television (HTV)
English-language television shows
Television shows set in Wales
Television series set in the 1930s
1980s Welsh television series
1990s Welsh television series